Diego Orlando Suárez Saucedo (born October 7, 1992 in Santa Ana del Yacuma, Beni) is a Bolivian professional football player who currently plays for Club San José.

Career
Although Suárez did not make his debut in the Liga de Fútbol Profesional Boliviano with Blooming, he became the youngest footballer to play in the Copa Libertadores when he came on as a substitute for his club against Brazilian side Santos. In late March 2007, the Bolivian media claimed that Diego was about to be given a trial by famous English football club, Chelsea. These rumors were quashed that any contact was made by Chelsea  giving him a trial. The young Bolivian did make his way to Europe and in late November was signed by Ukrainian club Dynamo Kyiv.

Suárez signed with Club San José for the 2019 season.

International career
During January 2009, Suárez played in the South American Youth Championship for the Bolivian U-20 team, later in the year, he joined the Bolivian U-17 squad in Chile for the FIFA U-17 World Cup qualifiers.

References

External links
 

1992 births
Living people
People from Yacuma Province
Bolivian footballers
Bolivian expatriate footballers
Club Blooming players
FC Dynamo Kyiv players
Association football midfielders
Expatriate footballers in Ukraine
FC Dynamo-2 Kyiv players
Oriente Petrolero players
Club San José players